Shamushak may refer to:
 Shamushak-e Olya
 Shamushak-e Sofla